

The Amphisbatinae was a small subfamily of moths in the superfamily Gelechioidea. Like their relatives therein, their exact relationships are not yet very well resolved. The present lineage is often included in the Depressariinae as a tribe Amphisbatini, though more often within the context of a "splitting" approach to Gelechioidea systematics and taxonomy, wherein the Depressariinae are elevated to full family rank and the Amphisbatinae are treated as a subfamily therein. An even more extremely split-up layout even treats the Amphisbatinae as full family Amphisbatidae. In the scheme used here, the Amphisbatinae are included in the Oecophoridae as a subfamily alongside the Depressariinae.

That nonwithstanding, the delimitation of Amphisbatinae versus the Depressariinae and Oecophorinae is problematic, and several individual genera have been moved from one to the other. As regards subdivisions, the Amphisbatinae are commonly divided into the tribes Amphisbatini, Fuchsiini, Hypercalliini and Telechrysidini. But neither are these subdivisions as firmly delimited as it might seem, nor are they particularly diverse (several Amphisbatinae taxa are monotypic). Thus, the Amphisbatinae are here not divided into tribes pending the availability of more thorough phylogenetic studies and better information on the subfamily's scope and relationships.

More recently, it was discovered that the enigmatic genus Lypusa, traditionally held to be a monotypic family of Tineoidea, is closely related to Amphisbatis and Pseudatemelia. The name for the combined group is to be determined.

Selected genera
Genera of Amphisbatinae include:
 Amphisbatis Zeller, 1870
 Anchinia Hübner, 1825 (Oecophorinae?)
 Eupragia Walsingham, 1911
 Fuchsia Spuler, 1910
 Hypercallia Stephens, 1829 (Oecophorinae?)
 Paratemelia
 Pseudatemelia
 Telechrysis Toll, 1956 (Oecophorinae?)

Footnotes

References
 See also Gelechioidea Talk page for comparison of some approaches to gelechioid systematics and taxonomy.
  (2009): Amphisbatinae. Version 2.1, 2009-DEC-22. Retrieved 2010-FEB-27.
  (2009): Markku Savela's Lepidoptera and some other life forms – Depressiinae [sic]. Version of 2009-AUG-20. Retrieved 2010-APR-27.

 
Oecophoridae